Michael Bailey, described as "one of the foremost eco-warriors of our times" according to Rex Weyler, is a founding member of Greenpeace, along with Paul Watson, Patrick Moore, David McTaggart and others. He supervised the original Greenpeace flagship, Rainbow Warrior.

The Climate Summit
Presently serving as Operations Director for The Climate Summit, which uses interactive videoconferencing technologies provided by Cisco Systems Inc.,  Bailey conducts presentations and educates people on the growing issue of climate change and global warming. He is an authorized presenter of The Climate Project  founded by Al Gore, who trained Bailey in the art of presentations pertaining to climate issues, ocean acidification and greenhouse gas emissions.

Anti-Whale Hunt Campaigning 
As a conservationist and adventure program producer, he retains a special interest in Cetacea. Bailey joined Greenpeace in 1975 and volunteered to pilot a Zodiac inflatable boat in front of a Russian harpoon ship, resulting in iconic images of the whalers firing 90 mm harpoon cannons at activists that were to establish Greenpeace in the public consciousness. These actions earned him the nickname "Zodiac Mike" or "Generalissimo".

Bailey has played a major part in the raising of public opinion and government support against the whaling industry  and as an official observer at the International Whaling Commission.

Kuwait Wildlife Campaign
Featured on the cover of a National Geographic magazine, Earthtrust was the first environmental organization to enter Kuwait after the 1991 Gulf War, with Michael Bailey and Rick Thorpe assessing the environmental damage cause by the burning in Kuwait oil fields of Kuwait. They subsequently formed the Kuwait Environmental Information Center and deployed oil barriers to protect wetlands and took action resulting in the fires being extinguished more quickly. This was memorialized in the internationally broadcast Earthtrust documentary Hell on Earth and a five-part Canadian Broadcasting Corporation mini-series.

Food Campaigns
Bailey has also campaigned against food irradiation  and was a director of the Conservation Council of Hawai'i.

Other accomplishments
In 2005, he was awarded the Anuenue Award by the Conservation Council of Hawaii for being the 'volunteer of the year' for his dedication to "creating a better world for wildlife and future generations" by documenting plastic pollution, campaigning to protect the Arctic from oil drilling and for working with indigenous peoples such as the Gwich'in and Inupiaq; including organizing the Arctic Film Festival.

Filmography
 Oil on Ice , International Documentary Association’s 2004 Pare Lorentz Award for Democratic Sensibility and Activist Spirit. A Sierra Club Production
 ‘Great Adventures’ 1999- 2005. Producer, on-camera Host about mountaineering expeditions to the Antarctica.
 'Wild Rescues' for Animal Planet TV Series.
 'Effective Microorganisms' weekly television series

Biography
 The Greenpeace story by Michael Harold Brown, Prentice-Hall (University of Michigan) Canada, 1989
 Men and Whales by Richard Ellis. Robert Hale, (University of Virginia) 1992

See also 
	
 Conservation movement
 Environmentalism
 Environmental movement
 Dolphin drive hunting

References

External links
 Planetviews Productions
 
 Save Japan Dolphins
 Conservation Council for Hawai'i

Green thinkers
Canadian environmentalists
People from Vancouver
1954 births
Living people
People associated with Greenpeace